is a 1957 Japanese film directed by Kazuo Mori.

Cast 
 Raizo Ichikawa
 Ryūji Shinagawa
 Yōko Uraji
 Michiko Ai
 Yôichi Funaki
 Ichirô Izawa
 Akio Kobori
 Kumeko Urabe

References

External links 
 
  http://www.raizofan.net/link4/movie2/inazuma.htm

Japanese black-and-white films
1957 films
Films directed by Kazuo Mori
Daiei Film films
1950s Japanese films